Ruaka may refer to:
 Ruaka, Kiambu County, a town in Kiambu County, Kenya
 Ruaka (wrestler), Japanese professional wrestler